Excitatory amino acid transporter 3 (EAAT3), is a protein that in humans is encoded by the SLC1A1 gene.

Tissue distribution
EAAT3 is expressed on the plasma membrane of neurons, specifically on the dendrites and axon terminals.

Function 

Excitatory amino acid transporter 3 is a member of the high-affinity glutamate transporters which plays an essential role in transporting glutamate across plasma membranes in neurons. In the brain, excitatory amino acid transporters are crucial in terminating the postsynaptic action of the neurotransmitter glutamate, and in maintaining extracellular glutamate concentrations below neurotoxic levels. EAAT3 also transports aspartate, and mutations in this gene are thought to cause dicarboxylic aminoaciduria, also known as glutamate-aspartate transport defect.  EAAT3 is also the major route of neuronal cysteine uptake.  Cysteine  is a component of the major antioxidant glutathione, and mice lacking EAAT3 exhibit reduced levels of glutathione in neurons, increased oxidative stress, and age-dependent loss of neurons, especially neurons of the substantia nigra. A meta-analysis identified a small but significant association between a polymorphism of the gene SLC1A1 and Obsessive-Compulsive Disorder.

Interactions 

SLC1A1 has been shown to interact with ARL6IP5.

See also 
 Excitatory amino acid transporter
 Glutamate transporter
 Solute carrier family

References

Further reading 

 
 
 
 
 
 
 
 
 
 
 
 
 
 
 
 

Amphetamine
Solute carrier family
Neurotransmitter transporters
Glutamate (neurotransmitter)